Klata (also known as Clata, Giangan, Bagobo, Jangan) is an Austronesian language of the southern Philippines. It is spoken on the eastern slopes of Mount Apo in Davao del Sur Province, as well as in Davao City (Ethnologue) in an area stretching from Catalunan to Calinan.

The nearby Tagabawa language is also known as Bagobo, and is not to be confused with Giangan.

Classification
Klata is usually classified as one of the South Mindanao languages. Zorc (2019) proposes that it is not included among the South Mindanao languages, but only more distantly related to them within a wider subgroup of the Philippine languages which he calls "Southern Philippine".

Distribution
Traditional Klata (Giangan) population centers included the following barangays (see also Districts of Davao City).

Biao, Tugbok District, Davao City
Tagakpan, Tugbok District, Davao City
Dulian
Sirib, Calinan District, Davao City
Gumalang, Baguio District, Davao City
Tamugan, Marilog District, Davao City

It is also spoken in Biao Joaquin, Calinan District and in various parts of Baguio District.

The Lipadas River separated the traditional Tagabawa and Clata territories, while the Talomo River (Ikawayanlinan) was the boundary separating the Tagabawas, Clatas, and Obos. The Davao River separated the traditional Bagobo and Clata territories.

Phonology
Klata has a five-vowel system consisting of the vowels . It also has consonantal geminates.

References

Further reading
Zorc, R. David. 1972. Giangan field notes.

External links
Klata recordings
Bagobo numerals
Guiangan (Baguio) word list (Austronesian Basic Vocabulary Database)
Guiangan (Sirib) word list (Austronesian Basic Vocabulary Database)

Languages of Davao del Sur
Languages of Davao Occidental
Philippine languages